Reynaldo B. Aguinaldo (September 28, 1946 – March 24, 2019) was a Filipino politician who served as mayor of Kawit, Cavite from 2007 to 2016. He had previously served as vice mayor for three consecutive terms, from 1998 to 2007.

Aguinaldo was a grandson (son of Emilio Aguinaldo, Jr.) of Emilio Aguinaldo, the first President of the Philippines.

He died from a cardiac arrest on March 24, 2019.

References

1946 births
2019 deaths
Reynaldo
People from Kawit, Cavite
Liberal Party (Philippines) politicians
Mayors of places in Cavite